The 2022 Central Europe Cup was a Twenty20 International (T20I) cricket tournament that was played in Prague between 8 and 10 July 2022. The participating teams were the hosts Czech Republic, along with Austria and Luxembourg – the same sides that competed in the previous edition of the tournament. The tournament was being played in a double round-robin format. This was the eighth edition of the Central Europe Cup, with Austria defending the title which they won on their debut at the Central Europe Cup in 2021.

Squads

Czech Republic named Vyshakh Jagannivasan and Sharan Ramakrishnan as reserves.

Points Table

Fixtures

References

External links
 Series home at ESPN Cricinfo

Associate international cricket competitions in 2022
Central Europe Cup